Coregonus nilssoni is a putative species of whitefish, part of the Coregonus lavaretus complex (European whitefish). It is a pelagic fish feeding on zooplankton. Its distribution is in lakes of Sweden, southern Norway, Denmark and Poland.

In Sweden, the name C. nilssoni has referred to a form of whitefish known as the planktonsik. That is however no more considered a distinct species but an ecotype within Coregonus maraena ("Coregonus maraena morphotype nilssoni"), and not different from "Coregonus maraena morphotype megalops".

References

nilssoni
Fish described in 1848